Bardhaman–Durgapur Lok Sabha constituency is one of the 543 parliamentary constituencies in India. The constituency is spread across Paschim Bardhaman district and Purba Bardhaman district in West Bengal. While five of the assembly seats of Bardhaman–Durgapur Lok Sabha constituency are in Purba Bardhaman district, two assembly segment is in Paschim Bardhaman district.

As per order of the Delimitation Commission in respect of the delimitation of constituencies in the West Bengal, Burdwan Lok Sabha constituency, Katwa Lok Sabha constituency  and Durgapur Lok Sabha constituency ceased to exist from 2009 and new constituencies came into being: Bardhaman Purba Lok Sabha constituency and Bardhaman–Durgapur Lok Sabha constituency.

Overview

Bardhaman–Durgapur Lok Sabha constituency is a new constituency that includes both the Bardhaman and Durgapur cities and the intermediate villages. In a pre-poll feature about the constituency, The Statesman wrote, "Shivnath Ghosh, a 55-year-old farmer of Belkash village, says, ‘I want the Left Front to be removed from power at the earliest as their sons and family members grab every facility, employment and trade all across the region.’ ... Shivnath's locality has witnessed a change in the guard after the Assembly and the panchayat polls, after the storm of ‘parivartan’ but still remains gasping for a ‘real wind of change’...  'Ahead of the Lok Sabha polls, we have new zamindars in the villages, especially the ‘Red Trinamul’ cadres and they dictate the terms leaving us in absolute jeopardy.'

"The Lok Sabha constituency has 15.81 lakh voters, 72 per cent of which comprise rural voters and 7.61 lakh female voters - the highest in the district…The state’s rice bowl also houses uncountable ailing industries…Nearly 1.5 lakh persons have lost their jobs due to retrenchment caused by the collapse of industries."

Assembly segments
Bardhaman–Durgapur Lok Sabha constituency (parliamentary constituency no. 39)  is composed of the following assembly segments:

Members of Parliament

For Members of Parliament from this area in previous years see Durgapur Lok Sabha constituency,  Burdwan Lok Sabha constituency and  Katwa Lok Sabha constituency.

Election results

General election 2019

General election 2014

General election 2009

References

See also
 List of Constituencies of the Lok Sabha

Lok Sabha constituencies in West Bengal
Politics of Paschim Bardhaman district
Politics of Purba Bardhaman district
Durgapur, West Bengal